Maximilian Meyer Heine (November 6, 1807 - November 6, 1879) was a German doctor and Russian state councilor. He served with the Russian Army during the Russo-Turkish War. He was the youngest brother of Heinrich Heine.

He graduated from the universities of Berlin and Munic in 1829 and joined the Russian army as a surgeon. He died in Berlin in 1879.

References

  Biography in 'German literary lives in St. Petersburg'

German military doctors
Physicians from the Russian Empire
Military personnel of the Russian Empire
1807 births
1879 deaths
German emigrants to the Russian Empire